Gornji Stupnik is a village in Croatia. It is connected by the D1 highway. It is part of the Zagreb County.

References

Populated places in Zagreb County